Prays ducalis is a moth in the  family Plutellidae.

External links
 Prays ducalis at www.catalogueoflife.org.

Plutellidae